The 1965 Major League Baseball season was contested from April 12 to October 14, 1965. The Los Angeles Dodgers and Minnesota Twins were the regular season champions of the National League and American League, respectively. The Dodgers then defeated the Twins in the World Series, four games to three.

The Houston Colt .45s became the Houston Astros, as they moved from Colt Stadium to the new Astrodome, becoming the first team to play their home games indoors, rather than outdoors.  It was also the final season for the Milwaukee Braves, before relocating and becoming the Atlanta Braves for the 1966 season. The Los Angeles Angels officially changed their name to California Angels on September 2, 1965, with only 28 games left in the season, in advance of their pending 1966 move to a new stadium in Anaheim, California.

In June, the first Major League Baseball draft was held in New York City. Teams chose players in reverse order of the previous season's standings, with picks alternating between American League and National League teams. With the first pick of the 1965 MLB draft, the Kansas City Athletics took Rick Monday, an outfielder from Arizona State University.

Awards and honors
Baseball Hall of Fame
Pud Galvin
Most Valuable Player
Zoilo Versalles, Minnesota Twins, SS (AL)
Willie Mays, San Francisco Giants, OF (NL)
Cy Young Award
Sandy Koufax, Los Angeles Dodgers
Rookie of the Year
Curt Blefary, Baltimore Orioles, OF (AL)
Jim Lefebvre, Los Angeles Dodgers, 2B (NL)
Gold Glove Award
Joe Pepitone (1B) (AL) 
Bobby Richardson (2B) (AL) 
Brooks Robinson (3B) (AL) 
Zoilo Versalles (SS) (AL) 
Tom Tresh (OF) (AL) 
Al Kaline (OF) (AL) 
Carl Yastrzemski (OF) (AL)
Bill Freehan (C) (AL) 
Jim Kaat (P) (AL)

MLB statistical leaders

1 National League Triple Crown Pitching Winner

Standings

American League

National League

Postseason

Bracket

Managers

American League

National League

Home Field Attendance

Events

January–April
January 31 – Pitcher Pud Galvin is chosen for Hall of Fame induction by the Special Veterans Committee.
April 9 – U. S. President Lyndon Johnson is on hand for an exhibition game between the New York Yankees and recently renamed Houston Astros.  It is the first game to be played indoors at the new Harris County Domed Stadium, which will soon be called the Astrodome. Mickey Mantle hits the first home run in the new domed stadium.
April 12 – The first official game at the Astrodome is played in front of over 43,000 fans, as they watch the Philadelphia Phillies defeat the host Astros, 2–0.
April 28 – Lindsey Nelson, broadcaster for the New York Mets, calls today's Mets-Astros game from a gondola suspended above second base in the Astrodome.

May–August
June 8 – The first Major League draft is held for high school and collegiate players.  The Kansas City Athletics use the first overall pick to draft Rick Monday.  In the tenth round, the New York Mets select Alvin, Texas high school pitcher Nolan Ryan.
July 13 – At Minnesota, Willie Mays hits a home run with two walks and two runs to pace the National League to a 6–5 All-Star Game victory over the American League. Juan Marichal pitches three scoreless innings to earn Game MVP.
August 19 – Jim Maloney walks ten Cubs, none of whom score.  Leo Cárdenas hits a home run off of the Wrigley Field's left field foul pole in the tenth inning for the game's only run;  winning the no hitter for Maloney. It was Maloney's second 10 inning no-hitter of the season; he lost the first one 1–0 when the Mets scored a run on two hits in the bottom of the 11th inning.
August 22 – A game between the Los Angeles Dodgers and San Francisco Giants at Candlestick Park turns ugly when San Francisco's starting pitcher, Juan Marichal, batting against Sandy Koufax in the third inning, attacks Dodgers catcher John Roseboro with his bat. Both benches clear and a 14-minute brawl ensues, before peacemakers such as Koufax and the Giants' Willie Mays restore order. A shaken-up Koufax then gives up a 3-run homer to Mays and the Giants win 4–3 to retake 1st place. National League president Warren Giles suspends Marichal for eight games and fines him $1,750, and also forbids him to travel with his team to Dodger Stadium for the final series of the season against the Dodgers. Although the Giants take both games during a 14-game winning streak, the Dodgers would go on to win the pennant, using a 13-game winning streak of their own to clinch the pennant over the rival Giants on the season's next to last day.
August 30 – Casey Stengel announces his retirement as manager of the New York Mets, ending a fifty-five-year career as player and manager.  He is the only man to have played for or managed all four of New York's Major League clubs.

September–December
September 2 – Ernie Banks hits his 400th career home run helping the Chicago Cubs beat the St. Louis Cardinals 5–3.
September 9 – At Dodger Stadium, a duel between the Los Angeles Dodgers' Sandy Koufax and Bob Hendley of the Chicago Cubs is perfect until Dodger left fielder Lou Johnson walks in the fifth inning. Following a sacrifice bunt, Johnson steals third base and scores on a throwing error by Cubs catcher Chris Krug. Johnson later has the game's only hit, a 7th-inning double. Koufax's fourth no-hitter in four years is a perfect game, the first in Dodgers history. One hit by two clubs in a completed nine-inning game is also a major league record, as is the one runner left on base. The two base runners in a game is an ML record. For Chicago pitchers, it is the second one-hitter they've thrown against the Dodgers this year and lost. A week later in the rematch in Chicago's Wrigley Field, Hendley beats Koufax and the Dodgers, 2–1.
September 13 – The San Francisco Giants' Willie Mays' hits his 500th home run off the Houston Astros' Don Nottebart, and Juan Marichal earned his 22nd victory as the Giants beat Houston 5–1 at the Astrodome. The win is the Giants' 11th straight and gives them a -game lead.
September 16 – On the same day Pinky Higgins is fired as Boston Red Sox general manager, Dave Morehead no-hits the Cleveland Indians 2–0 before only 1,247 fans at Fenway Park. Not until Hideo Nomo in 2001 will another Red Sox pitcher hurl a no-hitter, and the next Fenway Park no-hitter won't come until 2002 (Derek Lowe).
September 18 – "Mickey Mantle Day" is celebrated at Yankee Stadium on the occasion of Mantle's 2,000th career game (all with the Yankees).
September 25 – Though he had not pitched in the Major Leagues since 1953, the Kansas City Athletics send Satchel Paige to the mound.  At (approximately) 59 years old, he is the oldest pitcher in Major League history.  In three innings, he strikes out one, and gives up one hit, a single to Carl Yastrzemski.  Paige does not earn a decision in the loss to Boston, 5–2.
September 26 – The Minnesota Twins gain their first American League pennant since moving from Washington in 1961, ironically by defeating the expansion Washington Senators 2–1 at Washington's D.C. Stadium (which was renamed "Robert F. Kennedy Stadium" in 1969). Minnesota's Jim Kaat (17–11) wins the clincher.
October 2 – Sandy Koufax wins his 26th game as the Dodgers beat the Braves 3–1, for their 14th win in their last 15 games as they clinch the N.L. pennant.
October 7 – Jim Kaat gives Minnesota a 2–0 World Series lead by driving in two runs, defeating Sandy Koufax and the Los Angeles Dodgers 5–1 at Minnesota's Metropolitan Stadium. The game is remembered for Minnesota's Bob Allison remarkable sliding catch of a Jim Lefebvre line drive in the wet grass of Metropolitan Stadium.
October 14 – Working on two days rest, Sandy Koufax strikes out 10 and throws a three-hit, 2–0 shutout against the Minnesota Twins in Game Seven of the World Series, giving the Los Angeles Dodgers a second World Championship in three years. Lou Johnson's 4th inning leadoff home run off the left field foul pole gives Koufax the only run he'll need. A Ron Fairly double and Wes Parker single in the same inning add an insurance run to account for the 2–0 final. Koufax, who threw complete game shutouts in games 5 and 7,  is named Series MVP.
November 22 – Outfielder Curt Blefary of the Baltimore Orioles edges California Angels pitcher Marcelino López for American League Rookie of the Year honors.
November 26 – Los Angeles Dodgers second baseman Jim Lefebvre, who hit .250 with 12 home runs and 69 RBI, is voted National League Rookie of the Year over Houston Astros second baseman Joe Morgan (.271, 14, 40) and San Francisco Giants pitcher Frank Linzy (9–3, 43 strikeouts, 1.43 ERA).
December 9 – Cincinnati Reds Outfielder Frank Robinson is traded to the Baltimore Orioles for pitcher Milt Pappas, pitcher Jack Baldschun and outfielder Dick Simpson. Robinson would go on to win the Triple Crown and the Most Valuable Player in the American League for 1966.

See also
1965 Nippon Professional Baseball season

References

External links
1965 Major League Baseball season schedule

 
Major League Baseball seasons